Alberto Rodríguez Larreta (14 January 1934 – 11 March 1977) was a racing driver from Buenos Aires, Argentina.  He participated in one World Championship Formula One Grand Prix, the 1960 Argentine Grand Prix on 7 February 1960. Driving a Lotus 16 for Team Lotus, he qualified 15th and finished in ninth place. Larreta was reportedly offered a drive by Colin Chapman, but turned it down and continued competing in a wide variety of other motorsports until 1970. He died from a heart attack in 1977.

Complete Formula One World Championship results
(key)

References 

1934 births
1977 deaths
Racing drivers from Buenos Aires
Argentine racing drivers
Argentine Formula One drivers
Team Lotus Formula One drivers
Turismo Carretera drivers
World Sportscar Championship drivers